Qamar Bani Hashim may refer to:

 Abbas ibn Ali, also known as Qamar Bani Hashim, a son of Ali
 Muhammad: The Final Legacy, or Qamar Bani Hashim, a 2008 historical Arab drama series